Keep in Mind Frankenstein is the second full-length album by Seattle's Grand Archives.

Track listing 

 "Topsy's Revenge" - 3:42
 "Witchy Park/Tomorrow Will (Take Care Of Itself)" - 6:27
 "Silver Among The Gold" - 3:57
 "Oslo Novelist" - 3:51 
 "Lazy Bones" - 2:41
 "Siren Echo Valley (Part 1)" - 2:02
 "Left For All The Strays" - 3:17
 "Dig That Crazy Grave" - 4:25
 "Siren Echo Valley (Part 2)" - 2:38
 "Willoughby" - 2:39

References 

Grand Archives albums
2009 albums